Akbay is a Turkish surname. Notable people with the surname include:

 Ercan Akbay (born 1959), Turkish writer, painter, and musician
 Ismail Akbay (1930–2003), Turkish scientist who worked for NASA in the United States
 Nihat Akbay (1945–2020), Turkish footballer

Turkish-language surnames